Kykelikokos was a weekly Norwegian children's television program that ran from 1996 to 2003. It was the first live children's show ever produced in Norway. It was highly popular, and usually drew close to a quarter million viewers every week.

The show began in 1996, airing Saturdays at 8 to 10 AM, a timeslot it held throughout its entire seven-year run.

Norwegian children's television series
NRK original programming
Norwegian television shows featuring puppetry